WLIB AM: King of the Wigflip is a studio album by American hip hop musician Madlib. It was released on BBE and Rapster on September 29, 2008. It is the final installment of BBE's Beat Generation series.

Critical reception

At Metacritic, which assigns a weighted average score out of 100 to reviews from mainstream critics, the album received an average score of 72, based on 13 reviews, indicating "generally favorable reviews".

Track listing

Charts

References

External links
 

2008 albums
Madlib albums
Barely Breaking Even albums
Albums produced by Madlib
Albums produced by Karriem Riggins